Lug is a village in the municipality of Bajina Bašta, Serbia. According to the 2011 census, the village has a population of 2,789 inhabitants.

References

Populated places in Zlatibor District